Jerome Avenue is one of the longest thoroughfares in the New York City borough of the Bronx, New York, United States. Both of these termini are with the Major Deegan Expressway which runs parallel to the west. Most of the elevated IRT Jerome Avenue Line runs along Jerome Avenue. The Cross Bronx Expressway interchanges with Jerome and the Deegan. Though it runs through what is now the West Bronx neighborhood, Jerome Avenue is the dividing avenue between nominal and some named "West" and "East" streets in the Bronx; Fifth Avenue, and to a lesser extent, Broadway, also splits Manhattan into nominal "West" and "East" streets.

Street description

The south end of Jerome Avenue is at exit 5 of the Major Deegan Expressway. The road begins as a divided highway, intersecting with 161st Street, which goes east to Yankee Stadium and the 161st Street–Yankee Stadium station of the IRT Jerome Avenue Line (served by the ). Jerome merges into the road to the Macombs Dam Bridge and heads north, paralleling Macombs Dam Park. After some intersections with local roads, Jerome Avenue intersects with 167th Street which at the intersection which, west of there, is named Edward L. Grant Highway. Just east of the intersection is the 167th Street station, another station along the way. Several blocks north, 170th Street intersects, just before crossing the Edward L. Grant Highway.

Mt. Eden Avenue intersects in Morris Heights and the Cross Bronx Expressway does soon after. North the intersection with Tremont Avenue, Burnside Avenue intersects as Jerome Avenue leaves Morris Heights. 183rd street is the next major intersection, in University Heights. Fordham Road, both East and West intersect in University Heights. Saint James Park is passed to the east of Jerome, south of the intersection with Kingsbridge Road. As Jerome passes Lehman College, Bedford Park Boulevard (200th Street) intersects. Jerome Avenue then crosses the Mosholu Parkway on an overpass, after passing the Mosholu Yard.

After Mosholu Parkway, Jerome Avenue enters the Norwood neighborhood. There, Jerome Avenue intersects with Gun Hill Road, with Van Cortlandt Park to the west. The final station on the IRT line is located just before intersecting Bainbridge Avenue. Jerome Avenue continues, cuts between Van Cortlandt Park and Woodlawn Cemetery, after which it enters Woodlawn.  Jerome Avenue comes to an end at the Major Deegan and 233rd Street. The road continues as a service road for the Major Deegan, until it reaches the Bronx-Westchester border, where it becomes Central Park Avenue (NY 100), one of the main streets of the city of Yonkers.

History
Jerome Avenue was put together as a plank road in 1874 for $375,000. It appeared on maps as Central Avenue, because it started from Macombs Dam Bridge to Jerome Park Racetrack.  Borough President Louis F. Haffen selected contractors in 1897 to pave Jerome Avenue.  Three sections of the road were to be remodeled, costing the Bronx about $136,505. The street was to be renamed after an unknown city alderman. Kate Hall Jerome, wife of Lawrence Jerome, was furious, replacing all the signs with the name Jerome Avenue in honor of Jerome Park Racetrack opened by her husband's financier brother, Leonard Jerome in 1866. When the subway line was commissioned, Jerome went from rural road to commercial artery.

The southern part of the avenue, from the intersection with 161st Street, formed the western edge of Macombs Dam Park. The parkland was alienated by the state legislature to enable construction of a new Yankee Stadium. Lower portions of the thoroughfare were demapped by the City Planning Commission, followed by the Department of City Planning's 2006 release of the Bronx Harlem River Waterfront Bicycle and Pedestrian Study. The Park Plaza Apartments at 1005 Jerome Avenue, one of the borough's first and most prominent Art Deco apartment houses and a New York City landmark since 1981, was overlooked in the environmental impact statement and is now in the shadow of the completed new stadium.

In March 2018, the New York City Council voted to approve the rezoning of 92 blocks in the South Bronx, centered along Jerome Avenue from 165th to 184th Streets. The rezoning will allow developers to construct 4,600 housing units along the corridor, including 1,500 affordable housing units. At the time of the rezoning, the corridor consisted mainly of small businesses, warehouses, and auto-parts shops.

Transportation

The now-demolished Ninth Avenue elevated merged with the Jerome Avenue line south of the 167th Street station. All of the Jerome Avenue Line's elevated stations north of 167th Street, with the exception of Bedford Park Boulevard–Lehman College, are located directly above Jerome Avenue. The line and the  have their northern terminus at Woodlawn, at the eastern edge of Van Cortlandt Park.
 
The Jerome Avenue Line south of Kingsbridge Road opened on June 2, 1917. The Bedford Park Boulevard, Mosholu Parkway, and Woodlawn stations opened on April 15, 1918.

The Bx32 between Mott Haven and James J. Peters VA Medical Center supplements the IRT Jerome Avenue Line between 176th Street and Kingsbridge Road, running under the el between 175th Street and 195th Street. The  runs to/from Fordham and the BxM4 express bus run on Jerome Avenue for short lengths.

Major intersections

References 

Streets in the Bronx